George Theron Bynum IV (born August 28, 1977) is an American politician and lobbyist from the state of Oklahoma. A member of the Republican Party, Bynum is the 40th mayor of Tulsa, Oklahoma. Prior to becoming mayor, he served as a city councilor for Tulsa's ninth district. He is a political moderate.

Early life and education
A native of Tulsa, Oklahoma, Bynum attended Eliot Elementary School, Cascia Hall Preparatory School, and Villanova University. He served as student body president in his senior year at Villanova and founded a school club for Republicans.

Career 
Bynum worked as a staffer for United States senators Don Nickles and Tom Coburn from 2000 through 2006. He returned to Tulsa to work for a real estate auction company, Williams & Williams. He was laid off in 2009, along with a third of the Williams & Williams employees. He and a partner, Stuart McCalman, opened a lobbying firm,  Capitol Ventures Government Relations, working on behalf of municipalities and businesses.

In 2008, Bynum won election to a two-year term representing District 9 on the Tulsa City Council. He was re-elected three times. In 2011, his colleagues appointed him council chairman. He served as chairman through 2012. Bynum ran for mayor of Tulsa in 2016, and defeated Dewey F. Bartlett Jr., the incumbent mayor, in the June 2016 election by a 56 percent to 38 percent margin. By receiving over 50% of the vote, he avoided the August runoff election.  He was inaugurated as mayor on December 5, 2016. Bynum ran for reelection in 2020 and won outright, again avoiding a runoff election. He is the third-youngest person to serve as mayor of Tulsa. Bynum has said that he will not run for a third term for mayor in 2024.

In addition to his work as a staffer and politician, Bynum is the founder of The Greater Tulsa PAC; a political action committee created to support nonpartisan, "pro-Tulsa candidates" for the Tulsa City Council. Jacob Heisten, a registered Republican and former aide to Senator Jim Inhofe, is listed as the PAC's chairman. He is dedicated to the plan for Tulsa, Vision Tulsa.

Personal life
Bynum and his wife, Susan, have two children. His second child was born two weeks before he was laid off in 2009.

Robert J. LaFortune, the mayor of Tulsa from 1970 through 1978, is Bynum's grandfather. Bynum's uncle, Bill LaFortune, served as mayor from 2002 to 2006. Bynum is a great-great-grandson of Robert Newton Bynum, who served as mayor from 1899 to 1900.

See also
 List of mayors of the 50 largest cities in the United States

References

External links

Office of the Mayor, City of Tulsa

1977 births
21st-century American politicians
American lobbyists
Living people
Mayors of Tulsa, Oklahoma
Oklahoma city council members
Oklahoma Republicans
Place of birth missing (living people)
Villanova University alumni